Slot 1 refers to the physical and electrical specification for the connector used by some of Intel's microprocessors, including the Pentium Pro, Celeron, Pentium II and the Pentium III.  Both single and dual processor configurations were implemented.

Intel reverted to the traditional socket interface with Socket 370 in 1999.

General 

With the introduction of the Pentium II CPU, the need for greater access for testing had made the transition from socket to slot necessary.  Previously with the Pentium Pro, Intel had combined processor and cache dies in the same Socket 8 package.  These were connected by a full-speed bus, resulting in significant performance benefits.  Unfortunately, this method required that the two components be bonded together early in the production process, before testing was possible.  As a result, a single, tiny flaw in either die made it necessary to discard the entire assembly, causing low production yield and high cost.

Intel subsequently designed a circuit board where the CPU and cache remained closely integrated, but were mounted on a printed circuit board, called a Single-Edged Contact Cartridge (SECC).  The CPU and cache could be tested separately, before final assembly into a package, reducing cost and making the CPU more attractive to markets other than that of high-end servers.  These cards could also be easily plugged into a Slot 1, thereby eliminating the chance for pins of a typical CPU to be bent or broken when installing in a socket.

The form factor used for Slot 1 was a 5-inch-long, 242-contact edge connector named SC242.  To prevent the cartridge from being inserted the wrong way, the slot was keyed to allow installation in only one direction.  The SC242 was later used for AMD's Slot A as well, and while the two slots were identical mechanically, they were electrically incompatible.  To discourage Slot A users from trying to install a Slot 1 CPU, the connector was rotated 180 degrees on Slot A motherboards.

With the new Slot 1, Intel added support for symmetric multiprocessing (SMP). A maximum of two Pentium II or Pentium III CPUs can be used in a dual slot motherboard. The Celeron does not have official SMP support.

There are also converter cards, known as Slotkets, which hold a Socket 8 so that a Pentium Pro CPU can be used with Slot 1 motherboards. These specific converters, however, are rare.  Another kind of slotket allows using a Socket 370 CPU in a Slot 1.  Many of these latter devices are equipped with their own voltage regulator modules, in order to supply the new CPU with a lower core voltage, which the motherboard would not otherwise allow.

Form factors 

The Single Edge Contact Cartridge, or "SECC", was used at the beginning of the Slot 1-era for Pentium II CPUs. Inside the cartridge, the CPU itself is enclosed in a hybrid plastic and metal case. The back of the housing is plastic and has several markings on it: the name, "Pentium II"; the Intel logo; a hologram; and the model number. The front consists of a black anodized aluminum plate, which is used to hold the CPU cooler. The SECC form is very solid, because the CPU itself is resting safely inside the case. As compared to socket-based CPUs, there are no pins that can be bent, and the CPU is less likely to be damaged by improper installation of a cooler.

Following SECC, the SEPP-form (Single Edge Processor Package) appeared on the market. It was designed for lower-priced Celeron CPUs. This form lacks a case entirely, consisting solely of the printed-circuit board holding the components.

A form factor called SECC2 was used for late Pentium II and Pentium III CPUs for Slot 1, which was created to accommodate the switch to flip chip packaging. Only the front plate was carried over, the coolers were now mounted straight to the PCB and exposed CPU die and are, as such, incompatible with SECC cartridges.

History 

Historically, there are three platforms for the Intel P6 CPUs: Socket 8, Slot 1 and Socket 370.

Slot 1 is a successor to Socket 8. While the Socket 8 CPUs (Pentium Pro) directly had the L2-cache embedded into the CPU, it is located (outside of the core) on a circuit board shared with the core itself. The exception is later Slot 1 CPUs with the Coppermine core which have the L2-cache embedded into the die.

In the beginning of 2000, when the Pentium III CPUs with FC-PGA housing had already appeared, Slot 1 was slowly succeeded by Socket 370, after Intel had already offered Socket 370 and Slot 1 CPUs at the same time since late 1998. Socket 370 was initially made for low-cost Celeron processors, while Slot 1 was thought of as a platform for the more expensive Pentium II and early Pentium III models. Both cache and core were embedded into the die.

Slot 1 also obsoleted the old Socket 7, at least regarding Intel, as the standard platform for home users. After superseding the Intel P5 Pentium MMX CPU, Intel completely left the Socket 7 market.

Chipsets and officially supported CPUsList of VIA chipsets

Intel 440FX  
 Introduced in: May 6, 1996
 FSB: 66 MHz
 PIO/WDMA
 Supported RAM type: EDO-DRAM
 Supported CPUs:
 Pentium Pro
 Pentium II with 66 MHz FSB
 Celeron (Covington, Mendocino)
 Used in both Socket 8 (Pentium Pro) and Slot 1 (Pentium II, early Celerons)
 Does not support AGP or SDRAM
 Allowed up to two CPUs for SMP

Intel 440LX  
 Introduced in: August 27, 1997
 FSB: 66 MHz
 Supported RAM type: EDO-DRAM, SDRAM
 Supported CPUs: Pentium II, Celeron
 AGP 2× Mode
 UDMA/33
 Pentium II with 66 MHz FSB
 Celeron (Covington, Mendocino)
 Introduced support for AGP and SDRAM
 Allowed up to two CPUs for SMP

Intel 440EX  
 Introduced in: April, 1998
 FSB: 66 MHz
 Supported RAM type: EDO-DRAM, SDRAM
 Supported CPUs: Pentium II, Celeron
 AGP 2× Mode
 UDMA/33
 Pentium II with 66 MHz FSB
 Celeron (Covington, Mendocino)
 Same specifications as 440LX, but memory support limited to 256MB and no SMP support.

Intel 440BX  
 Introduced in: April 1998
 FSB: 66 and 100 MHz (some motherboards supported overclocking to 133 MHz, allowing usage of Socket 370 CPUs using a Slocket)
 AGP 2× Mode (max aperture size 32 or 64 MB)
 UDMA/33
 Supported RAM types: SDRAM (PC66 and PC100, PC133 with overclocking) up to 4 DIMMs of 256 MB
 Supported CPUs:
 Pentium II with 66 and 100 MHz FSB
 Pentium III with 100 MHz FSB (133 with overclocking)
 Celeron (Covington, Mendocino, Coppermine)
 Allowed up to two CPUs for SMP

Intel 440ZX 
 Introduced in: November 1998
 FSB: 66 and 100 MHz (some motherboards supported overclocking to 133 MHz, allowing usage of Socket 370 CPUs using a Slocket)
 AGP 2× Mode
 UDMA/33
 Supported RAM types: SDRAM (PC66 and PC100, PC133 with overclocking), up to 2 DIMMs of 256 MB
 Supported CPUs:
 Pentium II with 66 and 100 MHz FSB
 Pentium III with 100 MHz FSB (133 with overclocking)
 Celeron (Covington, Mendocino, Coppermine)

Intel 810 
 Introduced in: 1999
 FSB: 66 and 100 MHz
 No external AGP
Intel i752 based graphics
 UDMA/66 (UDMA/33 with ICH0)
 Supported RAM types: PC100 SDRAM
 Supported CPUs:
 Pentium II with 66 and 100 MHz FSB
 Pentium III with 100 MHz FSB (133 with overclocking)
 Celeron (Covington, Mendocino, Coppermine)

Intel 820/820E (Camino) 
 Introduced in: November 1999
 FSB: 100 and 133 MHz
 AGP 4× Mode
 UDMA/66 (i820), UDMA/100 (i820E)
 Supported RAM types: RDRAM, SDRAM (PC100 via MTH)
 Supported CPUs: All FSB 100/133 Slot 1 CPUs
 Allowed up to two CPUs for SMP

Intel 840 
 Introduced in: November 1999
 FSB: 100 and 133 MHz
 AGP 4× Mode
 UDMA/66 (i820), UDMA/100 (i820E)
 Supported RAM types: Dual Channel RDRAM, SDRAM (PC100 via MTH)
 Supported CPUs: All FSB 100/133 Slot 1 CPUs
 Allowed up to two CPUs for SMP

VIA Apollo Pro / Pro II / Pro+ 
 Introduced in: May 1998 (Pro Plus: Dec 1998)
 FSB: 66, 100 MHz (some motherboards supported overclocking to 133 MHz, allowing usage of Socket 370 CPUs using a Slocket)
 AGP 2× Mode
 UDMA/33 (VT82C586B/VT82C596A), UDMA/66 (VT82C596B)
Supported RAM types: PC66/100 SDRAM up to 1536 MB
 Supported CPUs:
 Pentium Pro with 66 MHz FSB
 Pentium II with 66 and 100 MHz FSB
 Pentium III with 100 MHz FSB (133 with overclocking)
 Celeron (Covington, Mendocino, Coppermine)

VIA Apollo Pro 133 
 Introduced in: July 1999
 FSB: 66, 100, and 133 MHz
 AGP 2× Mode
 UDMA/33 (VT82C596A), UDMA/66 (VT82C596B/VT82C686A), UDMA/100 (VT82C686B)
Supported RAM types: PC66/100/133 SDRAM up to 1536 MB
 Supported CPUs: All Slot 1 CPUs

VIA Apollo Pro 133A 
 Introduced in: Oct 1999
 FSB: 66, 100, and 133 MHz
 AGP 4× Mode
 UDMA/66 (VT82C596B/VT82C686A), UDMA/100 (VT82C686B)
Supported RAM types: PC66/100/133 SDRAM up to 2048 MB
 Supported CPUs: All Slot 1 CPUs
 Allowed up to two CPUs for SMP

SiS 5600 (SiS 600) 
 Introduced in: November 1998
 FSB: 66 and 100 MHz 
 AGP 2× Mode
 UDMA/33
 Supported RAM types: PC66/100 SDRAM up to 1536 MB
 Supported CPUs:
 Pentium II with 66 and 100 MHz FSB
 Pentium III with 100 MHz FSB 
 Celeron (Covington, Mendocino, Coppermine)

SiS 620 
 Introduced in: April 1999
 FSB: 66 and 100 MHz 
 No external AGP port
SiS 6326 based Integrated Graphics
 UDMA/33
 Supported RAM types: PC66/100 SDRAM up to 1536 MB
 Supported CPUs:
 Pentium II with 66 and 100 MHz FSB
 Pentium III with 100 MHz FSB 
 Celeron (Covington, Mendocino, Coppermine)

See also
 Slot A
 Slot 2
 List of Intel microprocessors
 Slotket

References

External links 

 Intel's detailed Slot 1 CPU (Coppermine) information, including Slot 1 pinout
An image of a motherboard with Slot 1 connector

Intel CPU sockets